Fleshburn is a 1984 American thriller film written and directed by George Gage and starring  Steve Kanaly, Karen Carlson and Sonny Landham.

Plot

Cast 

 Steve Kanaly as  Dr. Sam MacKenzie
 Karen Carlson as Shirley Pinter
 Macon McCalman as Earl Dana
 Robert Chimento  as Jay Pinter
 Sonny Landham as Calvin Duggai
 Robert Alan Browne as Jim Brody
 Duke Stroud as Smyley
  Larry Vigus as Marine Sergeant
  Newton John Skinner as Chris

References

External links 

American thriller films
1984 thriller films
2000s English-language films
1980s English-language films
1980s American films
2000s American films